Christian Pouget (born January 11, 1966 in Gap, France) is a retired French professional ice hockey player.

Achievements

Olympic career
Pouget competed in three Olympics representing France - 1988, 1992, and 1998.  At the 1998 games he scored the game winning goal against Japan.

Career statistics

Deutsche Eishockey Liga

References

External links

1966 births
Living people
Brûleurs de Loups players
Chamonix HC players
French expatriate ice hockey people
French expatriate sportspeople in Canada
French ice hockey left wingers
Ice hockey players at the 1988 Winter Olympics
Ice hockey players at the 1992 Winter Olympics
Ice hockey players at the 1998 Winter Olympics
Olympic ice hockey players of France
People from Gap, Hautes-Alpes
Rapaces de Gap players
Trois-Rivières Draveurs players
Sportspeople from Hautes-Alpes